Georges Aeby (21 September 1913 – 15 December 1999) was a Swiss footballer who played for Switzerland in the 1938 FIFA World Cup. He also played for FC Biel-Bienne, Servette FC, FC Lausanne-Sport, and Urania Genève Sport. He was Paul Aeby's younger brother.

References

External links
FIFA profile

1913 births
1999 deaths
Sportspeople from the canton of Fribourg
Swiss men's footballers
Switzerland international footballers
1938 FIFA World Cup players
Association football forwards
FC Biel-Bienne players
Servette FC players
FC Lausanne-Sport players
Urania Genève Sport players
People from Fribourg